Julian Norfleet (born November 2, 1991) is an American professional basketball player for APOEL of the Cypriot League. He played college basketball for the Mount St. Mary's University.

High School career
Norfleet played for Landstown High School, at Virginia Beach, Virginia.

College career
Norfleet played for Mount St. Mary's Mountaineers from 2010 until 2014.

Professional career
After going undrafted in the 2014 NBA draft, Norfleet signed with BC Rilski Sportist of the NBL for the 2014-15 season. On September 20, 2016, he joined ZTE of the Hungarian League. The following season, he stayed in Hungary and joined Falco Szombathely.

On October 1, 2020, he joined APOEL of the Cypriot League.

References

External links
 at espn.go.com
 at basketball.eurobasket.com
 at mountathletics.com
 at sportando.com

1991 births
Living people
American expatriate basketball people in Bulgaria
American expatriate basketball people in Hungary
American expatriate basketball people in Switzerland
American men's basketball players
Basketball players from Virginia
BC Rilski Sportist players
Falco KC Szombathely players
Kaposvári KK players
Mount St. Mary's Mountaineers men's basketball players
Point guards
Shooting guards
Sportspeople from Virginia Beach, Virginia
ZTE KK players